Werewolves in Their Youth is a 1999 short story collection by Michael Chabon.

Stories collected
"Werewolves in Their Youth" 
"House Hunting" 
"Son of the Wolfman"
"Green's Book"
"Mrs. Box" 
"Spikes"
"The Harris Fetko Story"
"That Was Me"
"In the Black Mill"

The collection
With the exception of the concluding story, all involve failed or failing marriages. The final story, "In the Black Mill" is introduced as the work of August Van Zorn, a fictional writer from Chabon's Wonder Boys. It is a throwback to pulp horror stories of the pre-World War II era.

1999 short story collections
Short story collections by Michael Chabon